Mycobacterium doricum is a species of the phylum Actinomycetota (Gram-positive bacteria with high guanine and cytosine content, one of the dominant phyla of all bacteria), belonging to the genus Mycobacterium.

It is a scotochromogenic Mycobacterium.

Type strain
Strain FI-13295 = CCUG 46352 = CIP 106867 = DSM 44339 = JCM 12405.

References

External links
Type strain of Mycobacterium doricum at BacDive -  the Bacterial Diversity Metadatabase

Acid-fast bacilli
doricum
Bacteria described in 1992